The 2006 Tampa Bay Buccaneers season was the franchise's 31st season in the National Football League the 9th playing their home games at Raymond James Stadium, and the 5th under head coach Jon Gruden.

The team failed to improve on their 11–5 record in 2005, tumbled to a 4–12 record and missed the playoffs for the third time in four seasons.

Summary
After winning their division in 2005, the Buccaneers suffered through an abysmal 2006 season. The season was plagued by injuries, with starters such as G Dan Buenning, WR Michael Clayton, RB Carnell Williams, DE Simeon Rice, CB Brian Kelly, and QB Chris Simms all being placed on injured reserve at some point in the season. The season also saw a lot of rookies starting for the Bucs, such as QB Bruce Gradkowski, T Jeremy Trueblood, and G Davin Joseph. The league schedule was also unfriendly to the Bucs, scheduling them for 3 games (two of them away games) within 11 days of each other.

There was more to the lost season than just injuries, as most of the players put on injured reserve had been done so after the team's 0–3 start, and offensive shutouts in the first two games in which no touchdowns were scored by the Buccaneers. The departure of several key defensive coaches and assistants didn't bode well with players, who complained to some in the media of not being able to hear coaches in team meetings.

Inconsistent and unorganized are how some players referred to one of the newcomers, who most players had a hard time making the transition from longtime favorites Rod Marinelli and others. Some believe the problems in 2006 were rooted in recent years mistakes, lack of salary cap room to bring in high impact free agents, lack of top 50 draft picks over the last 5 or 6 years due to trades, and maybe even a failure to properly assess talent resulting in a lack of contribution from second day draft picks in recent history.

The Bucs started off the season 0–3, with QB Chris Simms throwing only 1 touchdown to 7 interceptions. In the third game of the season, a last-minute loss to the Carolina Panthers, Simms's spleen was ruptured, and he was placed on injured reserve for the rest of the season. After their bye week, the Bucs elected to start rookie quarterback Bruce Gradkowski, a 6th-round pick from Toledo.

Gradkowski started off performing decently. People who in hindsight claim the Bucs should have started the more experienced Tim Rattay forget the Bucs nearly upset the New Orleans Saints, and then went on to win two narrow victories: one, against the Cincinnati Bengals, winning on an overturned call resulting in a touchdown; and another against the Philadelphia Eagles, thanks to Matt Bryant’s 62-yard field goal. After these victories, though, Gradkowski’s performance declined. After a 3–17 loss to the New York Giants in heavy winds, the Bucs proceeded to lose 5 of their next 6 games, leading them to a record of 3–10 (0–6 in their division). In the loss to the Atlanta Falcons, Gradkowski was replaced in the 4th quarter by Rattay.

In the first half of the Bucs' next game, against the Chicago Bears, Gradkowski was again replaced by Rattay, who led the team from a 24–3 deficit to a score of 31–31, with three touchdowns in the fourth quarter. However, the Bucs then lost the game in overtime, 34–31. Rattay was then named the new starting quarterback for the last two games for the season. The Bucs finished their season with a 4–12 record, tied for third worst in the NFL. The overall defense was ranked in the low 20s, the first time a Tampa defense was not ranked in the top ten since 1996.

The Bucs sent three players to the 2007 Pro Bowl, cornerback Ronde Barber, tight end/long snapper Dave Moore (A "Need" player according to Saints coach Sean Payton), and late addition outside linebacker Derrick Brooks (as an injury replacement). This would be Brooks's 10th consecutive Pro Bowl and 10th Pro Bowl overall.

It was also the final season for longtime fullback Mike Alstott. Although he was on the roster the following season, he was unable to play due to a preseason neck injury against New England.

Offseason
In the 2006 NFL Draft, the Buccaneers used their first pick on Oklahoma Guard Davin Joseph. They then used their next pick on Boston College OT Jeremy Trueblood. The rest of their picks included Notre Dame WR Maurice Stovall, Penn St. CB Alan Zemaitis, Stanford DE Julian Jenkins, Toledo QB Bruce Gradkowski, North Carolina St. TE T.J. Williams (who was lost for the upcoming season to injury when he tore his right Achilles tendon the week of June 19), Oregon CB Justin Phinisee, Clemson DE Charles Bennett, and Michigan TE Tim Massaquoi.

After a potential season-ending injury to backup quarterback Luke McCown, the Buccaneers signed veteran quarterback Jay Fiedler to back up Chris Simms on June 29. The signing maintains the four-deep status of the backup quarterback position, as Tim Rattay, Jared Allen, and Bruce Gradkowski are still on the roster (as of July 18). Additionally, the team signed two-year veteran tight end Matt Kranchick to replace T.J. Williams, who was lost for the season due to injury, as noted above.

Staff

Roster

Preseason
The Tampa Bay Buccaneers played four preseason games. The home team is in capital letters. 
 August 11 BUCCANEERS 16, Jets 3
 August 19 Dolphins 13, BUCCANEERS 10
 August 26 Jaguars 29, Buccaneers 18
 August 31 Texans 16, Buccaneers 13

Schedule
In the 2006 regular season, the Bucs’ non-divisional conference opponents were primarily from the NFC East, although they also played the Seattle Seahawks who headed the 2005 NFC West, and the Chicago Bears who had headed the 2005 NFC North. Their non-conference opponents were from the AFC North.

 Indicates the Thanksgiving Day game.
 Indicates game is Monday Night Football.

Standings

Regular season

Week 1: vs. Baltimore Ravens

The Buccaneers opened the regular season at home against the Baltimore Ravens on September 10 by being shutout for the first time since Week 14 of the 2005 season. The game began with the Ravens scoring a touchdown after a clock-killing 80-yard drive, and the Bucs were never able to respond. Bucs QB Chris Simms threw three interceptions and many of his passes were batted down at the line of scrimmage, an issue that was present during the pre-season and would continue to plague Simms in the next two games. In addition, second-year RB Carnell Williams struggled with back spasms and was held to just 22 rushing yards on 8 carries.

Week 2: at Atlanta Falcons

The Bucs went to the Georgia Dome for a Week 2 contest against their division rival, Atlanta Falcons. Historically, the Buccaneers had been able to effectively contain Falcons' QB Michael Vick, shutting down the Falcons' offense in the process. However, the Bucs' performance here had not improved much from Week 1. The defense was unable to stop the running duo of Vick and RB Warrick Dunn, whose combined performance netted 261 yards, and 306 for Atlanta as a team—a new Falcons team record. Also illustrating their sharp fall in performance from their #1 NFL ranking the previous season, the Bucs' defense also allowed a 1-yard QB TD run by Vick and a 4-yard TD pass to FB Fred McCrary. Bucs QB Chris Simms continued to struggle, throwing another three interceptions, while Carnell Williams was held to just 37 yards on 15 carries. The Bucs' only points came on a chip-shot 22-yard field goal by kicker Matt Bryant.

Week 3: vs. Carolina Panthers

The Bucs played one of their most heated rivals, the Carolina Panthers, at home. In the first half, it was a rout 20–7 with Bucs QB Chris Simms' first pass intercepted by the Panthers' Chris Gamble. In the second quarter, Tampa Bay finally scored its first touchdown of the season on a short pass from Simms to Joey Galloway, then followed that up in the third quarter with Carnell Williams scoring his first TD run of the season. Later that quarter, Simms led a drive that was wrapped up by a 2-yard bootleg by Simms on a fake to Mike Alstott, but Simms was hit hard on the play, and had to leave the game momentarily to let rookie Bruce Gradkowski take over. Simms returned in the fourth quarter to lead another scoring drive which ended with a long field goal by Matt Bryant. Unfortunately for the Bucs, the Panthers' kicker John Kasay hit his fourth field goal of the day, winning the game for the Panthers with only six seconds to spare. After the game, it was learned that Simms had a ruptured spleen and went into emergency surgery to remove it. Originally diagnosed as bruised ribs, it was only discovered shortly after the game ended. If discovery had been delayed any longer, Simms would have died. The injury cost Simms the rest of the season.

Week 4: Open date
The Buccaneers bye week was scheduled for week 4.

Week 5: at New Orleans Saints

Coming off their bye week, the Buccaneers were still looking for their first win of the season. The Bucs traveled to the Louisiana Superdome for their third divisional match-up in a row—this time, against the New Orleans Saints. The Bucs scored first as rookie QB Bruce Gradkowski threw an 18-yard TD pass to WR Joey Galloway in the first quarter; the Saints responded with a 21-yard field goal from kicker John Carney. The Saints continued scoring, with a 24-yard TD run from RB Deuce McAllister in the second quarter, and a 9-yard TD pass to TE Ernie Conwell in the third quarter. The Bucs finally responded with a 1-yard TD run from FB Mike Alstott, and took the lead in the fourth quarter with Gradkowski's 3-yard TD pass to TE Alex Smith. Unfortunately for the Bucs, a special teams breakdown led to Saints RB Reggie Bush getting his inaugural NFL touchdown on a 65-yard punt return, which sealed the win for the Saints.

Week 6: vs. Cincinnati Bengals

The Bucs were predicted by many as an underdog by several sports commentators to defeat the 3–1 Bengals, and they pulled off an upset win, with Bruce Gradkowski throwing 2 touchdowns, and Cadillac Williams running for 94 yards. With 34 seconds remaining in the 4th quarter, Gradkowkski threw a pass to wide receiver Michael Clayton, who appeared to cross the goal line in a dive, but dropped the football in the end zone. The pass was initially ruled incomplete. The replay official initiated a review, and referee Mike Carey determined that Clayton had possession of the football when he crossed the plain of the goal line. The call was reversed, and the Buccaneers were awarded the touchdown. At the end of regulation, Shayne Graham had a chance to win the game with a 62-yard field goal, but missed it wide right, giving the Bucs their first win of 2006.

Week 7: vs. Philadelphia Eagles

The Bucs entered week 7 against an Eagles team looking to build upon their 14–13 win over the Bengals. The Bucs defense stepped up big early, particularly Ronde Barber, who returned two Donovan McNabb interceptions for touchdowns. The Bucs however blew a 17-point lead when Brian Westbrook scored on a 52-yard touchdown with 33 seconds left. With two timeouts remaining, the Bucs drove to the Philadelphia 45-yard line with 4 seconds left. Kicker Matt Bryant then converted on an improbable, franchise record 62-yard field goal as time expired to give the Bucs a 23–21 victory. Ironically, the kick was the same distance Bengals' Shayne Graham missed from the previous week. The Bucs improved to 2–4. The kick was one yard short of the NFL record (63 yards) and the second-longest game-winning field goal in NFL history.

With an announced crowd of 65,808 the game stands as the highest-attended regular season Buccaneers game all-time at Raymond James Stadium.

Week 8: at New York Giants

Hoping to build on their dramatic home win over the Eagles, the Buccaneers flew to Giants Stadium for their Week 8 game with the New York Giants. Bucs CB Ronde Barber would be facing his brother, RB Tiki Barber for the last time in NFL competition as the latter planned to retire after the season. In the first quarter, Tampa Bay fell behind early, as QB Eli Manning completed a 7-yard TD pass to WR Plaxico Burress for the only score of the period. In the second quarter, the Bucs' woes continued as Giants RB Brandon Jacobs got a 1-yard TD run. Kicker Matt Bryant would get Tampa Bay a 43-yard field goal, but that would all of the points that the Bucs would get, because after a scoreless third quarter, Giants kicker Jay Feely kicked a 31-yard field goal to put the game away. With their loss, the Buccaneers fell to 2–5.

Week 9: vs. New Orleans Saints

Hoping to rebound from their road loss to the Giants, the Buccaneers went home for an NFC South rematch with the New Orleans Saints. In the first quarter, the Bucs trailed early as Saints QB Drew Brees completed a 15-yard TD pass to WR Marques Colston and a 52-yard TD pass to WR Devery Henderson. In the second quarter, kicker John Carney helped New Orleans improve its lead with a 46-yard field goal. Tampa Bay would valiantly fight back, as QB Bruce Gradkowski completed a 44-yard TD pass and a 17-yard TD pass to WR Joey Galloway, but that would be as close as they would get. In the third quarter, Saints pulled away with RB Deuce McAllister completing a 3-yard TD run and Brees completing a 45-yard TD pass to Henderson. With a scoreless second half, the Bucs would fall to 2–6.

Week 10: at Carolina Panthers

The Buccaneers travelled to Bank of America Stadium for an NFC South rematch on Monday Night Football with the Carolina Panthers. In the first quarter, QB Bruce Gradkowski completed a 6-yard TD pass to WR Ike Hilliard for the only score of the period and the first half. However, in the third quarter, the Panthers struck back with a vengeance as kicker John Kasay nailed a 28-yard field goal, QB Jake Delhomme completing a 4-yard TD pass to WR Keyshawn Johnson, and FB Brad Hoover contributing a 5-yard TD run. In the fourth quarter, even though kicker Matt Bryant would nail 28-yard field goal, Carolina managed to put the game away with Delhomme completing a 36-yard TD pass to WR Steve Smith. With the loss, the Bucs fell to 2–7.

Week 11: vs. Washington Redskins

Hoping to rebound from their three-game losing streak, the Buccaneers went home for rematch of last season's NFC Wildcard match-up with the Washington Redskins. In the first quarter, the Bucs drew first blood with kicker Matt Bryant nailing a 26-yard field goal, while Redskins kicker Nick Novak got a 45-yard field goal. After a scoreless second quarter, Washington took the lead in the third quarter with QB Jason Campbell completed a 3-yard TD pass to TE Chris Cooley. Tampa Bay would respond with QB Bruce Gradkowski completed a 2-yard TD pass to TE Anthony Becht. In the fourth quarter, the Bucs managed to wrap-up the game with Gradkowski completing a 34-yard TD pass to WR Joey Galloway, while Bryant kicked a 31-yard field goal. Even though the Redskins would get a 4-yard TD pass from Campbell to TE Todd Yoder, the Bucs held on to win and advance to 3–7.

Week 12: at Dallas Cowboys

Hoping to build on their home win over the Redskins, the Buccaneers flew to Texas Stadium for a Thanksgiving game against the Dallas Cowboys. In the first quarter, the Bucs capped off their opening driver with FB Mike Alstott getting a 1-yard TD run. However, the Cowboys responded with QB Tony Romo getting a 30-yard TD pass to WR Terry Glenn. In the second quarter, Romo and Glenn hooked up with each other again on a 2-yard TD pass. The Bucs could only respond with kicker Matt Bryant getting a 46-yard field goal. Dallas would respond with Romo getting a 1-yard TD pass to RB Marion Barber. In the third quarter, Romo and Barber would hook up with each other again on a 2-yard TD pass, with Romo also hooking up with WR Terrell Owens on a 7-yard TD pass. In the fourth quarter, kicker Mike Vanderjagt would close out the scoring with a 22-yard field goal. With the loss, the Bucs fell to 3–8.

Week 13: at Pittsburgh Steelers

Bruce Gradkowski’s homecoming was also his worst game of the season. In the first quarter, Ben Roethlisberger threw his only interception early in the game to linebacker Derrick Brooks. Later in the quarter, Gradkowski tossed his first interception to Steeler linebacker Larry Foote. In the final seconds of the first quarter, Roethlisberger threw a short touchdown pass to tight end Jerame Tuman. Later in the second half, Gradkowski tossed another interception in the red zone to Bryant McFadden. Steeler kicker Jeff Reed, kicked a fifty-yard field goal to end the first half. After another interception of Gradkowski in the second half, Roethlisberger completed a touchdown pass in the early fourth quarter. By the two-minute warning, the score was 20–0, in the favor of the Steelers. Tampa Bay kicker Matt Bryant, made sure the Bucs did not get shut out with a 27-yard field goal in the last seconds of regulation.

Week 14: vs. Atlanta Falcons

Trying to snap a two-game losing skid, the Buccaneers went home for an NFC South rematch with the Atlanta Falcons. In the first half, the Bucs jumped out to an early lead as kicker Matt Bryant got a 42-yard field goal in the first quarter, while nailing a 24-yard field goal in the second quarter. However, for the rest of the game, it was all Atlanta. In the third quarter, the Falcons took the lead with OLB Demorrio Williams returning a fumble 54 yards for a touchdown, while FB Justin Griffith got a 21-yard TD run. In the fourth quarter, Atlanta wrapped up their season sweep over Tampa Bay with kicker Morten Andersen nailing a 23-yard field goal. With the loss, the Buccaneers fell to 3–10.

Week 15: at Chicago Bears

The Bears entered week 15 of the NFL season hoping to secure a first-round bye and home-field advantage throughout the NFC playoffs. Chicago led 24–3 with 5:22 left in the third quarter and were en route to winning their third straight. During the first quarter, the Bucs had only reached 80 yards in total offense. Coach Jon Gruden sent in back-up Tim Rattay, who completed 20 of 35 for 268 yards with 3 touchdowns and one interception as the Bucs battled back to tie the game up at 31 during the fourth quarter. A controversial move was made by Chicago Bears' head coach Lovie Smith as he decided to let time expire during the fourth quarter and thus send the game into overtime. Tampa Bay won the coin toss, and both teams had three possessions in overtime. After missing earlier in the overtime period, Robbie Gould connected on a 27-yard field goal with 3:37 remaining to give the Bears the victory, 34–31. This loss sent the struggling Buccaneers to 3–11 which secured last place in the NFC South standings.

Week 16: at Cleveland Browns

Trying to end a four-game losing skid, the Buccaneers flew to Cleveland Browns Stadium for a Week 16 interconference fight with the Cleveland Browns on Christmas Eve. In the first half, the Bucs got off to a decent start with kicker Matt Bryant nailing a 23-yard field goal in the first quarter and a 24-yard field goal in the second quarter. In the third quarter, Tampa Bay increased its lead RB Michael Pittman's 11-yard TD run (following PAT was blocked). In the fourth quarter, the Pewter Pirates’ defense got a chance to score with OLB Derrick Brooks returning an interception 21 yards for a touchdown. Afterwards, the Browns would get their only score of the game as CB Daven Holly returned a fumble 40 yards for a touchdown. After that, the Bucs wrapped the game up with Bryant's 37-yard field goal. With the win, the Buccaneers improved to 4–11.

Week 17: vs. Seattle Seahawks

Trying to end their season on a high note on New Year's Eve, the Buccaneers hosted the NFC West champion Seattle Seahawks. Tampa Bay trailed early as Seahawks kicker Josh Brown nailed a 35-yard field goal, which was followed by RB Shaun Alexander's one-yard TD run. In the second quarter, the Bucs got their only score of the game with QB Tim Rattay completing a 4-yard TD pass to WR Joey Galloway. Afterwards, Seattle continued its dominance with QB Matt Hasselbeck completing a 5-yard TD pass to WR D.J. Hackett. After that, the Seahawks wrapped up the game in the second half with Brown getting a 30-yard field goal in the third quarter and a 23-yard field goal in the fourth quarter. With the loss, the Buccaneers ended their year at 4–12.

Tampa Bay Buccaneers season
Tampa Bay Buccaneers
21st century in Tampa, Florida
Tampa Bay Buccaneers seasons